Orca Airways was a scheduled and charter airline based in Vancouver, British Columbia, Canada. The airline provided scheduled commercial service, cargo and charter services, and aircraft management in Canada and the western United States. Orca operated a fleet of that includes 14 Piper PA-31-350 Chieftains, 1 Fairchild SA227s and 2 Beechcraft Model 100 King Air. The company operated from the south terminal at Vancouver International Airport.

History
Orca Airways was a family-owned airline which was founded in January 2005, and began operations in July 2005. At the time it only operated routes from Vancouver International Airport to Tofino/Long Beach Airport operating one Piper Navajo on this route. It soon began expanding to provide charter service and cargo service. Orca Airways had the largest Navajo fleet airline in Canada and continued to expand providing scheduled and cargo routes across British Columbia.

On 27 February 2009 the airline acquired the small regional carrier Airspeed Aviation which was established in 1986 and based in Abbotsford, British Columbia. 

On March 15, 2018 Transport Canada suspended the airline's operating certificate citing its "repeated non-compliance with aviation safety regulations".

Destinations
As of April 2018, Orca Airways flew to the following destinations:
 Canada, British Columbia
 Port Alberni ground service from Qualicum Beach 
 Qualicum Beach (Qualicum Beach Airport)
 Tofino (Tofino/Long Beach Airport)
 Vancouver (Vancouver International Airport)
 Victoria (Victoria International Airport)

Fleet
As of May 2018 Orca Airways fleet was still listed with Transport Canada:

See also 
 List of defunct airlines of Canada

References

External links

Official Company Site

Regional airlines of British Columbia
Airlines established in 2005
2005 establishments in British Columbia
Defunct airlines of Canada
Airlines disestablished in 2018
2018 disestablishments in British Columbia